Russkaya Trostyanka is a rural locality (a selo) in Shubinskoye Rural Settlement, Ostrogozhsky District, Voronezh Oblast, Russia. The population was 405 as of 2010. There are 7 streets.

Geography 
Russkaya Trostyanka is located 27 km west of Ostrogozhsk (the district's administrative centre) by road. Strelitsa is the nearest rural locality.

References 

Rural localities in Ostrogozhsky District